Morrison may refer to:

People
 Morrison (surname), people with the Scottish surname Morrison
 Morrison Heady (1829–1915), American poet
 Morrison Mann MacBride (1877–1938), Canadian merchant

Places in the United States
 Morrison, Colorado
 Morrison, Illinois
 Morrison, Iowa
 Morrison, Missouri
 Morrison, Oklahoma
 Morrison, Tennessee
 Morrison, Wisconsin, a town
 Morrison (community), Wisconsin, an unincorporated community
 Morrison County, Minnesota
 Morrison Township, Aitkin County, Minnesota

Other uses
 Clan Morrison, a Scottish clan
 Morrison Formation, a distinctive sequence of Upper Jurassic sedimentary rock in the western United States
 Morrison Hall, a residential hall at the University of Hong Kong
 Webb Horton House, now known as Morrison Hall
 Morrison Lake (disambiguation)
 Morrison, a 19th-century American merchant ship of the Morrison Incident
 USS Morrison (DD-560), a Fletcher-class destroyer sunk in the Pacific in 1945
 Verticordia nitens, a flowering plant commonly known as Morrison

See also
 List of organisations with Morrison in their name
 List of places with Morrison in their name
 Morrison's (disambiguation)
 Morrisons, a chain of supermarkets in the United Kingdom
 
 
 Morison, a surname
 Morrisonia, genus of moths
 Morrisonville (disambiguation)
 Morrisson (disambiguation)